The House of the Crows is a 1941 Argentine film directed by Carlos F. Borcosque.

Cast
 Luis Aldás
 Amelia Bence
 Juan Bono
 Dario Cossier
 Enrique Giacovino
 Emilio Gola
 Miguel Gómez Bao

External links
 

1941 films
1940s Spanish-language films
Argentine black-and-white films
Argentine drama films
1941 drama films
1940s Argentine films